Matt Wait (born June 2, 1976 in Lodi, California, United States) is an American motorcycle racer.

Grand Prix motorcycle racing

By season

Races by year

(key) (Races in bold indicate pole position, races in italics indicate fastest lap)

External links
Profile on MotoGP.com

1976 births
Living people
American motorcycle racers
500cc World Championship riders